Liu Xiaofeng may refer to:

 Liu Xiaofeng (politician) (born 1947), Chinese politician

 Liu Xiaofeng (academic) (born 1956), scholar in Christianity and political theory
 Liu Xiaofeng (footballer) (born 1985), Changsha Ginde football player